New York Ninja is a 2021 American action film written, directed by and starring John Liu. It was shot in 1984, but was not edited or released until 2021, when its footage was discovered and restored by the film preservation and home video distributor Vinegar Syndrome.

New York Ninja was filmed in New York City, and was shelved after its original distribution company went bankrupt. The abandoned footage was eventually acquired by Vinegar Syndrome; without audio, storyboards, or scripts for the film, it was reconstructed by a new director, Kurtis M. Spieler, and dubbed dialogue was recorded by actors including Don "The Dragon" Wilson, Michael Berryman, Cynthia Rothrock, Linnea Quigley, Vince Murdocco, Matt Mitler, Leon Isaac Kennedy, and Ginger Lynn.

Cast
 John Liu as Liu, an employee of a New York City television news station
 Don "The Dragon" Wilson as the voice of Liu
 Ginger Lynn as the voice of Nita, Liu's wife
 Michael Berryman as the voice of the Plutonium Killer
 Linnea Quigley as the voice of Randi Rydell

Adult film star Sharon Mitchell has a brief cameo on the subway train.

Production
Filming for New York Ninja began in late 1984 in New York City. According to the film's special effects artist, Carl Morano, "They had zero resources. Different people showed up on different days. We'd meet every morning at the Howard Johnson's where John [Liu] was staying and then take a van to the location." The film had an estimated special effects budget of $100, most of which Morano reportedly spent on creating the Plutonium Killer's melting face.

Despite advertisements for the film appearing in trade magazines in 1984, the footage shot for New York Ninja was shelved after its distribution company, 21st Century Distribution Corporation, went bankrupt and sold its assets.

Reconstruction and release

The footage shot for New York Ninja was stored in film reels, ran about six to eight hours in length and included no actor credits. It was eventually acquired by Vinegar Syndrome, a film preservation and home video distribution company. Without audio, storyboards, or scripts, Kurtis M. Spieler (credited as the film's "re-director" and editor) was tasked with reconstructing the film from the footage alone. The only known surviving script is Morano's shooting script, which alluded to a character named "Detective Dolemite"; the original filmmakers may have intended the character to have been played by Rudy Ray Moore, who appeared in the 1975 film Dolemite.

Spieler suspects that Liu may have been unable to complete filming before the production shut down, saying that "the ending doesn't feel like it was ever finished". Vinegar Syndrome considered filming new scenes, but Spieler decided to work only with the original footage. In an interview with The New York Times, he said: "I asked myself, 'If my job was to have been an editor in the 1980s, what would I have done? Speaking to Paste, he said:
I was very aware of trying to maintain what I thought was the intended spirit or tone of the original production. I knew there was a fair amount of both intentional and unintentional humor to the movie, but I tried to take the project seriously and be respectful to the original source material as well as other movies from the same time period.

Spieler commissioned the Detroit band Voyag3r to create the score, and hired actors including Don "The Dragon" Wilson, Michael Berryman, Cynthia Rothrock, Linnea Quigley, Vince Murdocco, Matt Mitler, Leon Isaac Kennedy and Ginger Lynn to record new dialogue, which was dubbed over the footage.

The reconstructed version of New York Ninja premiered at Beyond Fest in California in October 2021. It was released on Blu-ray by Vinegar Syndrome in November 2021.

Critical reception
On Rotten Tomatoes, the film has an approval rating of 96% based on 23 reviews, with an average rating of 7.3/10.

Josiah Teal of Film Threat called the film "rewatchable, quotable, and perfect for a Samurai Cop or Bruceploitation double-feature", and wrote that "Vinegar Syndrome has found/created a fantastic cult classic". J. Hurtado of Screen Anarchy called the film "the kind of gem that demands viewing with a crowd", writing: "As downright goofy as New York Ninja is, it's the genuine heart of the original production that really makes the whole thing work. Liu may not have been a high-minded artiste, but he knew what he wanted, and what he wanted was to bring the high-octane, high-camp action of late '70s Hong Kong to the streets of New York."

See also
 List of ninja films
 "So bad it's good"

References

External links
 
 

2021 action films
2021 martial arts films
1980s rediscovered films
Rediscovered American films
Films shot in New York City
Films set in New York City
Ninja films
2020s English-language films